Juozapas is a Lithuanian masculine given name. It is a cognate of the English language name Joseph.

List of people named Juozapas 
Juozapas Baka (1707–1780), late Baroque poet, Jesuit priest and missionary
Juozapas Kazimieras Kosakovskis (1738–1794), bishop
Juozapas Montvila (1850-1911), social worker, bank owner and philanthropist
Juozapas Oleškevičius (c.1777–1830), Polish-Lithuanian painter
Juozapas Senkalskis (1904–1972), painter, printer, etcher and illustrator
Juozapas Skvireckas (1873–1959),  Lithuanian archbishop of Kaunas

Masculine given names
Lithuanian masculine given names